Michael Knott is an American singer-songwriter and frontman for various bands, many of them Christian. He has released some 35 albums, including solo albums and with bands such as LSU and Cush.

Background 
Knott's music has sometimes been controversial in Christian circles, particularly due to profanity in the song "Rocket and a Bomb" (from the self-titled release of his former band Aunt Bettys) and original artwork in that album of Jesus Christ as a bartender. Knott's songwriting appealed to many people, particularly Christians who could admit their flaws, and who appreciated the honesty with which he tackled his own shortcomings. Examples include "Double," "Shaded Pain" and the aforementioned "Rocket and a Bomb." Knott explained some of his views in an interview with HM Magazine, saying, "Basically, I'm a human being and I believe in Christ, period. It doesn't make my life rosy, it doesn't make my life terrible, it doesn't do anything with that. I know Christ."

Career highlights include LSU's epic Cornerstone appearance in '93 (band dressed in costumes), Aunt Bettys record-label bidding war and eventual signing with Elektra (1995) and a Jed the Fish "Catch of the Day" spin on KROQ for the Strung Gurus' "Sun-Eyed Girl." Members of Cush and Aunt Bettys joined Knott on stage for a Dennis Danell benefit concert at Verizon Wireless with a line-up that also included Pennywise, Offspring, X and Social Distortion. Aunt Bettys and Mike Knott songs are prominently featured in the 1998 indie film "Boogie Boy" (Imperial), exec-produced by Grammy-winning "Pulp Fiction" co-writer Roger Avary.

Knott is a painter, frequently signing his works under the name 'Gerard'. His artwork has been used for cover art on many of his own releases as well as releases by The Choir, Charity Empressa, and others. When he began touring again in 2000, Knott began creating painting series that he sold at shows and eventually online.

Michael Knott was the founder of the now defunct independent record label, Blonde Vinyl Records, and co-founded Tooth and Nail Records with Brandon Ebel.

After ending their contract with Elektra, Aunt Bettys released their second album Ford Supersonic (originally through Marathon Records). The band quit by the decade's end, and Knott started Strung Gurus with Social Distortion founding-guitarist Dennis Danell. When Danell died in early 2000, Knott began self-releasing several albums (many of which featured previously unreleased tracks) to coincide with a number of solo acoustic tours. In Sept. 2010, Aunt Betty's Ford (using their original name) reformed for a show at the Detroit Bar in Costa Mesa, their first show together in 13 years. A handful of other shows have followed.

Knott's 2010 album, PTSD by L.S. Underground is a concept album dealing with a soldier's posttraumatic stress disorder, a common risk for veterans of war. The band includes Crucified drummer Jim Chaffin. PTSD was given a generally positive review by D.W. Dunphy by Popdose. Dunphy's said, "L.S Underground still survives, and while the music isn't for everyone, it is a welcome reminder to his fans that Michael Knott and company are back doing what they do best."

On September 7, 2014, Knottheads.com, the Michael Knott tribute site and his former label Blonde Vinyl, announced that a Kickstarter campaign to mark the 20th anniversary of Rocket and a Bomb was live. A concert was planned for November 7, 2014 in Concord, California, in which the Rocket and a Bomb record was performed in its entirety. The full-band performance by Michael Knott was billed to feature special guests Michael Roe and Derri Daugherty, along with a special appearance by Dead Artist Syndrome. The Kickstarter project, which had a goal of $9,000, was fully funded prior to its deadline. On December 29, 2014, Knott had a heart attack which left him recovering from surgery for the first part of 2015. A recording of the 2014 "Rocket and a Bomb" live performance as well as a new studio EP, Songs From The Feather River Highway, was digitally distributed to Kickstarter backers by May 2016. A release of the EP via Bandcamp followed.

Bands
Knott has participated in and/or formed many bands, including:
 The Hightops - Early pop-punk band when Knott was a teenager (songs appear as bonus tracks on Huntington Beach album)
 The Lifesavors or Lifesavers - early '80s pop punk
 L.S.U. aka Lifesavers Underground - darker, goth-y alt-rock
 Bomb Bay Babies - general market guitar-driven pop punk band, signed to publishing deal with Windswept Pacific
 Idle Lovell - dark alt-rock in a slightly different vein than LSU
 Michael Moret - A Dead or Alive-style new wave dance album that Knott wished he'd never made
 Aunt Bettys - Originally Aunt Bettys Ford, a story-telling general market rock band Knott started in '93
 Cush - Post-modern rock band with former members of The Prayer Chain
 Strung Gurus - Acoustic rock band with Social Distortion guitarist Dennis Danell (RIP February 29, 2000)
 Struck Last May - 2007 project with Rick McDonough that dabbles into "... To Kill a Mocking Bird meets Sesame Street"

Discography (solo)
 Screaming Brittle Siren - 1992 (Blonde Vinyl)
 Rocket and a Bomb - 1994 (Brainstorm Artists, Intl)
 Fluid - 1995 (Alarma Records)
 Strip Cycle - 1995 (Tooth & Nail)
 Definitive Collection - 1999 (KMG)
 Bomb Bay Babies - 2000 (Independent)
 Live in Nash Vegas - 2000 (Independent)
 Things Jenison Found in the Closet - 2000 (Independent)
 Things I've Done, Things to Come - 2000 (Independent)
 Live at Cornerstone 2000 - 2000 (M8)
 Mother Nation (with Noah Reimer) - 2001 (Independent)
 Life of David - 2001 (Metro One, Review: HM Magazine)
 Hearts of Care - 2002 (Northern Records)
 Hearts of Care Demos - 2003 (Independent)
 Spring 2003 Tour CD #1 a.k.a. Jesus Help Me - 2003 (Independent)
 Spring 2003 Tour CD #2 a.k.a. Gerard - 2003 (Independent)
 Comatose Soul - 2004 (Independent)
 The All Indie E.P. - 2006 (Independent) - Only 500 signed and numbered copies.
 Songs From The Feather River Highway EP - 2016 (Independent) - Financing and initial distribution via Kickstarter.

Video 
 Daniel Amos - Instruction Through Film DVD, cameo

References

Further reading

External links
 Michael Knott Tribute Site

American performers of Christian music
Tooth & Nail Records artists
Year of birth missing (living people)
Living people